Social Policy (Basic Aims and Standards) Convention, 1962 is  an International Labour Organization Convention.

It was established in 1962, with the preamble stating:
Having decided upon the adoption of certain proposals concerning the revision of the Social Policy (Non-Metropolitan Territories) Convention, 1947, which is the tenth item on the agenda of the Session, primarily with a view to making its continued application and ratification possible for independent States,...

Ratifications
As of the end of 2015, the treaty has been ratified by 33 states.

External links 
Text.
Ratifications.

International Labour Organization conventions
Social policy
Treaties concluded in 1962
Treaties entered into force in 1964
Treaties of the Bahamas
Treaties of Bolivia
Treaties of the military dictatorship in Brazil
Treaties of the Central African Republic
Treaties of Costa Rica
Treaties of the Democratic Republic of the Congo (1964–1971)
Treaties of Ecuador
Treaties of Georgia (country)
Treaties of Ghana
Treaties of Guatemala
Treaties of Guinea
Treaties of Israel
Treaties of Italy
Treaties of Jamaica
Treaties of Jordan
Treaties of Kuwait
Treaties of Madagascar
Treaties of Malta
Treaties of Moldova
Treaties of Nicaragua
Treaties of Niger
Treaties of Panama
Treaties of Paraguay
Treaties of Portugal
Treaties of the Socialist Republic of Romania
Treaties of Senegal
Treaties of Francoist Spain
Treaties of the Democratic Republic of the Sudan
Treaties of Syria
Treaties of Tunisia
Treaties of Ukraine
Treaties of Venezuela
Treaties of Zambia
1962 in labor relations